Phalonidia unguifera is a species of moth of the family Tortricidae. It is found in Brazil in the states of Rio Grande do Sul, Paraná, Minas Gerais, Goias, Santa Catarina and São Paulo.

References

Moths described in 1976
Phalonidia